Catalepidia is a genus of a sole described species of medium-sized trees, constituting part of the plant family Proteaceae. The species Catalepidia heyana grows naturally only in a restricted mountain region (endemic) of the wet tropics rain forests of north-eastern Queensland, Australia. Common names include Hey's nut or Hey's nut oak.

The species was formally scientifically described by Frederick Manson Bailey in 1901 based on plant material collected from Palm Camp at Mount Bellenden Ker. Bailey placed the new species in the genus Helicia, and named it  Helicia heyana. In 1955 the species was transferred to the genus Macadamia by Dutch botanist Hermann Sleumer and finally to the newly erected genus Catalepidia by Peter Weston in 1995.

References

External links
 Photographs of Catalepidia heyana at the Australian Plant Image Index

Proteaceae
Endemic flora of Queensland
Proteales of Australia
Monotypic Proteaceae genera
Plants described in 1901
Wet Tropics of Queensland